Karolina Chrapek (born 18 January 1990 in Würzburg, Germany) is an alpine skier representing Poland. She competed for Poland at the 2014 Winter Olympics in the alpine skiing events. She finished 17th in the combined, 33rd in the downhill and giant slalom, and failed to finish the slalom and super-G. She also competed at the FIS Alpine World Ski Championships in 2011 and 2013. In 2011, she finished 20th in the super combined, 33rd in the slalom and 34th in the super-G, while in 2013 she finished 27th in the super combined. Chrapek also competed at the 2013 Winter Universiade, where she finished second in the super-G and third in the downhill.

References

1990 births
Polish female alpine skiers
Polish expatriate sportspeople in Germany
Alpine skiers at the 2014 Winter Olympics
Olympic alpine skiers of Poland
Universiade medalists in alpine skiing
Sportspeople from Würzburg
Living people
Universiade silver medalists for Poland
Universiade bronze medalists for Poland
Competitors at the 2011 Winter Universiade
Competitors at the 2013 Winter Universiade
Competitors at the 2015 Winter Universiade
21st-century Polish women